Mitchell Jones (born December 12, 1992 in Delta, British Columbia) is a Canadian professional box lacrosse player for the Philadelphia Wings of the National Lacrosse League (NLL). Jones plays for the Chrome Lacrosse Club of the Premier Lacrosse League.

Junior and Major
Jones began his amateur career with the Jr. A Delta Islanders of the BC Junior A Lacrosse League in 2007.
He played for the Brampton Excelsiors Jr. A of the Ontario Junior A Lacrosse League for the 2010 and 2011 seasons. In 2012, Jones played for the Orangeville Northmen Jr. A and was a key player in the club's Minto Cup championship run. Jones amassed 67 points in 11 regular season games and went on to finish third in the Minto Cup tournament scoring, finishing with 37 points over 13 games. In 2013, Jones signed with the Victoria Shamrocks of the Western Lacrosse Association (WLA) and won the Mann Cup in 2015. The following season Jones was traded to the New Westminster Salmonbellies for several draft picks.
Jones holds two Canadian Lacrosse records. 1. ”Most points in a Minto Cup finals game (13)” and 2. “Most points in a Mann Cup Series (39)”.

National Lacrosse League
Jones was drafted in the third round (21st overall) of the 2012 NLL Entry Draft by the Washington Stealth, and played three games in his rookie year. In 2013, Jones was dealt to the Buffalo Bandits in exchange for several draft picks. Jones had his first breakout season in the National Lacrosse League in 2016, tallying 33 points over 17 games. The following season, Jones had his best season with 69 points. On November 28, 2018 Jones was traded from the Buffalo Bandits to the Vancouver Warriors in exchange for Corey Small.

Premier Lacrosse League
On October 22, 2018 it was announced that Jones was joining the Premier Lacrosse League for the summer 2019 season. On March 4, 2019 it was announced that Jones was joining the Chrome Lacrosse Club.

Statistics

NLL
Reference:

References

1986 births
Living people
Canadian lacrosse players
Washington Stealth players
Buffalo Bandits players
Lacrosse people from British Columbia
People from Delta, British Columbia
Vancouver Warriors players
Premier Lacrosse League players
Lacrosse forwards